Vincent "Vince" Anderson (born December 8, 1984) is a former gridiron football defensive back. He was signed by the New York Giants as an undrafted free agent in 2009. He played college football at Webber International.

Anderson was also a member of the Tampa Bay Buccaneers.

Professional career

New York Giants
Anderson was signed by the New York Giants as an undrafted free agent following the 2009 NFL Draft on April 29, 2009. He was waived on September 5 during final cuts, but was re-signed to the team's practice squad on September 6. He was placed on the practice squad injured reserve on December 8. He was signed to a reserve/future contract on January 4, 2010, but was waived on June 21 before the start of training camp.

Tampa Bay Buccaneers
Anderson was signed by the Tampa Bay Buccaneers on August 10, 2010. He was waived during final cuts on September 4, but was re-signed to the team's practice squad on September 5. He was promoted to the active roster on November 30. He was waived on August 29, 2011.

References

External links
Just Sports Stats
Montreal Alouettes bio
Tampa Bay Buccaneers bio

1984 births
Living people
Players of American football from Florida
American football safeties
New York Giants players
Tampa Bay Buccaneers players
Montreal Alouettes players
Webber International Warriors football players